Muhunoa East is a rural locality in the Horowhenua District of the Manawatū-Whanganui region of New Zealand's North Island.  It is located on the western side of the Tararua Range between the Ōhau River to the north and the Makorokio Stream to the south.

Demographics

Kimberley had a population of 447 at the 2018 New Zealand census, an increase of 48 people (12.0%) since the 2013 census, and an increase of 141 people (46.1%) since the 2006 census. There were 168 households. There were 225 males and 222 females, giving a sex ratio of 1.01 males per female. The median age was 45.6 years (compared with 37.4 years nationally), with 99 people (22.1%) aged under 15 years, 39 (8.7%) aged 15 to 29, 210 (47.0%) aged 30 to 64, and 99 (22.1%) aged 65 or older.

Ethnicities were 91.3% European/Pākehā, 16.1% Māori, 1.3% Pacific peoples, 1.3% Asian, and 2.7% other ethnicities (totals add to more than 100% since people could identify with multiple ethnicities).

The proportion of people born overseas was 14.8%, compared with 27.1% nationally.

Although some people objected to giving their religion, 61.1% had no religion, 23.5% were Christian, 0.7% were Buddhist and 2.7% had other religions.

Of those at least 15 years old, 60 (17.2%) people had a bachelor or higher degree, and 63 (18.1%) people had no formal qualifications. The median income was $29,500, compared with $31,800 nationally. The employment status of those at least 15 was that 171 (49.1%) people were employed full-time, 69 (19.8%) were part-time, and 12 (3.4%) were unemployed.

Education
Muhunoa East School first opened in 1904 in temporary premises as a "side school" to relieve overcrowding at Ohau School. It catered for students up to standard II (now Year 4, about 8 years old). It moved to a permanent building in 1908 and expanded to cover up to standard IV (Year 6). It closed in 1922 due to a falling roll, but reopened in 1926, and continued until January 2006. The school building was destroyed by fire in a suspected arson in 2011.

References

Populated places in Manawatū-Whanganui
Horowhenua District